Sybota is a genus of spiders.

Sybota may also refer to:
Sybota (Epirus), a town of ancient Epirus, Greece
Sybota Islands, islands off the coast of the former